PureTalk is an American mobile virtual network operator headquartered in Covington, Georgia, United States with two other offices located in Fort Lee, New Jersey and Atlanta, Georgia. It provides wireless service over the AT&T Mobility network. The company offers and services designed for older adults with no hidden fees.

See also 
 Consumer Cellular

References

External links
Official website

Mobile virtual network operators
Telecommunications companies established in 2011
2011 establishments in the United States

